Play On is the sixth solo album by John Miles released in 1983 via EMI label.

Overview
EMI promised that Miles would use a top producer and top session musicians for his second album for EMI.

Eventually they chose Gus Dudgeon who had worked with artists like Elton John, Chris Rea and Elkie Brooks. Originally, the album was planned to be released in 1982, but because Dudgeon was not available at the time, the release was delayed.

It was also the first time that drummer Barry Black and bassist Bob Marshall were not used on the album (although Marshall still wrote the songs with Miles). Instead they were replaced by session musicians.
"The Right to Sing" was the first single released from the album and was written about the fact that record companies wanted to decide which songs Miles had to release and which direction he had to take.

Another single, the catchy track "Song For You" became a small worldwide hit and was used as a soundtrack in TV commercials for cigarette brand "Hollywood" in Brazil and few other countries.

"That's Rock 'n' Roll" was left off the album because it was too different, and was subsequently released as a B-side.

"Carrie" was covered by The Hollies on the b-side of the 1988 re-release of their cover version of He Ain't Heavy, He's My Brother. John Miles sang backing vocals on it.

Track listing
All songs written by Bob Marshall and John Miles
"Take Me to My Heaven"
"Song for You" 
"It Wasn't Love at All"
"Ready to Spread Your Wings"
"I'll Never Do it Again"
"Heart of Stone"
"Home"
"Close Eyes, Count to Ten"
"Carrie"
"Right to Sing"

Personnel
John Miles - lead vocals, backing vocals, piano, guitar
Martin Jenner - acoustic guitar, guitar
Gus Dudgeon - tambourine on "The Right to Sing"
Graham Jarvis - drums
Paul Westwood - bass
Pete Wingfield - electric piano, organ, piano, synthesizer, clavinet, backing vocals
Duncan Mackay - synthesizer; vocoder on "Close Eyes Count to Ten"
Frank Ricotti - percussion
Jimmy Chambers, Katie Kissoon - backing vocals
Jerry Donahue - electric guitar on "Take Me to My Heaven"
Mel Collins - saxophone on "Take Me to My Heaven" and "Home"
Paul Buckmaster - orchestral arrangement on "Ready to Spread Your Wings"
Derek Wadsworth and Gus Dudgeon - arrangements on "Take Me to My Heaven" and "Heart of Stone"
Chris Hunter, Derek Wadsworth, Dick Morrissey, Jeff Daly - brass on "Take Me to My Heaven" and "Heart of Stone"
Bruce Baxter - orchestral arrangement on "The Right to Sing"

References

External links 
[ Billboard.com]

John Miles (musician) albums
1983 albums
Albums produced by Gus Dudgeon
EMI Records albums